The Royal Institute of Painters in Water Colours (RI), initially called the New Society of Painters in Water Colours, is one of the societies in the Federation of British Artists, based in the Mall Galleries in London.

History
In 1831 the society was founded as the New Society of Painters in Water Colours, competing with the Royal Watercolour Society (RWS), which had been founded in 1804. The founding members were William Cowen, James Fudge, Thomas Maisey (treasurer), O. F. Phillips, Joseph Powell (president), W. B. S. Taylor, and Thomas Charles Wageman. The New Society differed from the RWS in policy, by exhibiting non-members' work also. Both societies challenged the Royal Academy's refusal to accept the medium of watercolours as appropriate for serious art.

In 1839 Henry Warren (1794–1879) became president of the society and was re-elected for many years until he resigned due to failing eyesight. In 1863 there was a name change to the Institute of Painters in Water Colours. In 1883 it acquired its own premises at Piccadilly, across the road from the Royal Academy. In 1885 it added "Royal" to its title by command of Queen Victoria. When the lease to the Piccadilly premises ran out in 1970, it moved to the Mall Galleries, near to Trafalgar Square.

Royal Institute Galleries
The premises at 190-195 Piccadilly hosted many exhibitions by other societies and were known simply as "Royal Institute Galleries". It is now a grade II listed building. Number 195 is now home to BAFTA.

Prominent members

Anna Airy
Mike Bernard
George Henry Boughton
 Henry Charles Brewer
 Randolph Caldecott
Princess Patricia of Connaught
Fanny Corbaux
Walter Crane
Charles Dixon
Sam Dodwell
Lionel Edwards
Bernard Walter Evans
Emily Farmer
Kate Greenaway

Edward John Gregory
Louis Haghe
John Hassall
Eleanor Hughes
William Knight Keeling
Sir Coutts Lindsay
Sir James Linton
John Seymour Lucas
Fortunino Matania
Alfred Munnings
Charles Robinson
Frank O. Salisbury

Francis Job Short
William Simpson
Julia Sorrell
John Tenniel
Arthur Wardle
Edmund George Warren
John William Waterhouse
Harrison Weir
Leslie Arthur Wilcox
Norman Wilkinson
William Barnes Wollen
William Wyld

Honorary Members
 Sir James C Harris
 Charles III

References

Further reading

External links

Mall Galleries

British artist groups and collectives
19th-century art groups
1831 establishments in the United Kingdom
British art
British contemporary art
 
Water
Watercolor societies